Savatula Gundam Waterfalls is one of many waterfalls located in Komaram Bheem district in the Indian state of Telangana.

External links

Waterfalls of Telangana